Leon Bätge (born 9 July 1997) is a German footballer who plays as a goalkeeper for VSG Altglienicke.

References

External links
 Profile at DFB.de
 Profile at kicker.de

1997 births
Living people
People from Wolfsburg
Footballers from Lower Saxony
German footballers
Association football goalkeepers
Eintracht Frankfurt players
Würzburger Kickers players
VSG Altglienicke players
3. Liga players